Ny Illustrerad Tidning (Swedish: New Illustrated Newspaper) was a weekly newspaper published in Stockholm, Sweden, between 1865 and 1900.

History and profile
Ny Illustrerad Tidning was launched in Stockholm in 1865. The founder and editor was Elias Sehlstedt. It came out weekly on Saturdays. The paper featured travel notes of Norwegian author Camilla Collett. It also published travel notes and other articles of Gösta Mittag-Leffler who would become its editor.

The paper folded in September 1900 shortly after death of its founder Elias Sehlstedt.

References

External links

1865 establishments in Sweden
1900 disestablishments in Sweden
Defunct newspapers published in Sweden
Newspapers published in Stockholm
Publications established in 1865
Publications disestablished in 1900
Swedish-language newspapers
Weekly newspapers published in Sweden